The following is a list of episodes from Cobra Kai, an American comedy-drama streaming television series based on The Karate Kid film series created by Robert Mark Kamen. The first two seasons of the series were released on YouTube Red / YouTube Premium, while the latest three seasons have been released on Netflix.

 On January 20, 2023, the series was renewed for a sixth and final season.

Series overview

Episodes

Season 1 (2018)

Season 2 (2019)

Season 3 (2021)

Season 4 (2021)

Season 5 (2022)

Notes

References 

Cobra Kai